Nvumetta Ruth Kavuma better known as Ruth Kavuma is a Ugandan politician, rotarian and educator. She was the first African headmistress of Gayaza High School  for 11 years between 1990 and 2002. After leaving Gayaza High School, she joined politics and  became the woman Member of Parliament in the eighth Parliament of Uganda representing Kalangala District under the National Resistance Movement political party. She is a founding members of Forum for African Women Educationalists (FAWE) and became the first  Chairperson of Board of the Uganda Chapter, an organization that advocates for girl child education.

Persona life 
She was born in Ssese islands to James Lutaaya and bred in Gayaza High School. She has four children.

Education 
In 1963, she joined Gayaza Junior School and later joined Gayaza High School in 1970. She was a prefect and played Volleyball. She studied at Makerere University for a science degree in Physics, Chemistry and Mathematics, and later dropped Chemistry for Psychology.

Career 
She is the Vice Chairperson of National Identification and Registration Authority (NIRA). She is a member of the Network of African Ministers and Parliamentarians Uganda Chapter. During her political journey at the Parliament of Uganda, she served on the Finance Committee which gave her an opportunity to advocate for the enough resourcing to support reproductive health commodities.  She is the former Chairperson of Mama Alive Initiatives (MAI) and a member of the Network of Women Parliamentarians in Uganda. She belongs to the Rotary Club of Kampala Ssese Islands and served as the past President and past Governor of the club. She also chaired the construction of the Mengo Hospital Rotary Bank which is still working until now. She is a board member for the Concern for the Girl Child Uganda and a member of the Kisaakate Kya Nnabagereka Board.

In her early life, she worked as an engineering trainee with Uganda Post Office and Telecommunication. After sometimes, she realized that she did not like engineering and went back to Makerere for a Post Graduate Diploma in Education (1979-1980). After this course, she was posted to Gayaza High School and later left for politics in 2001 and became the  Kalangala District woman Member of Parliament.  She left politics which threatened NRM as a political party  over opposition politician taking over MP seat for Kalangala District. When she joined Gayaza High School to teach, she was nominated to the Parents and Teachers Association as a teachers’ representative. She was later appointed as the acting duty teacher and later confirmed as the  headmistress for the school. This happened when Sheelagh Warren, the school’s headmistress had clocked the retirement age of 60 and was returning to England. She is currently a counsellor.

See also 

 List of members of the eighth Parliament of Uganda
 Gayaza High School 
 Section about  Ruth Nvumetta Kavuma (1990–2002) on Gayaza High School 
 National Identification and Registration Authority

External links 

 Website of the Parliament of Uganda
 Website of Gayaza High School
 Website for Board of Directors-NIRA

References 

Living people
People from Kalangala District
Members of the Parliament of Uganda
Women members of the Parliament of Uganda
National Resistance Movement politicians
Ugandan Africanists
Makerere University alumni
Makerere University
Year of birth missing (living people)